Adam Michael Melhuse (born March 27, 1972) is an American former professional baseball catcher. He played in Major League Baseball (MLB) for the Los Angeles Dodgers, Colorado Rockies, Oakland Athletics and Texas Rangers. He is was the hitting coach for the Detroit Tigers AAA Toledo Mud Hens.

High school, college years
Melhuse attended Lincoln High School in Stockton, California and was a student and a letterman in basketball and baseball. He was 1991 West Coast Conference Freshman of the Year in baseball at Santa Clara before transferring to UCLA. In 1991, he played collegiate summer baseball with the Harwich Mariners of the Cape Cod Baseball League, and returned to the league in 1992 to play for the Brewster Whitecaps.

Major League Baseball career
Previously, Melhuse played with the Los Angeles Dodgers, Colorado Rockies, Oakland Athletics, and Texas Rangers. He throws right-handed and is a switch-hitter.

Colorado Rockies
Melhuse collected his first career hit on August 22, in the 12th inning of an unusual game between the Rockies and Atlanta Braves. Out of pitchers, Rockies manager, Buddy Bell, asked injured catcher, Brent Mayne, who was unable to swing a bat due to a sprained left wrist, if he could pitch. Mayne pitched the 12th inning and held the Braves scoreless. The following inning, with two outs and the bases loaded, Melhuse, pinch hitting for Mayne, singled off of Stan Belinda over shortstop Walt Weiss' head to win the game in walk-off fashion by a score of 8-7. This victory also earned Mayne a pitching win in what would be his only career outing on the mound.

Oakland Athletics
On November 6, 2002 Melhuse signed a minor league contract with the Oakland Athletics. He would spend four seasons with the club as a backup to Damian Miller and later Jason Kendall, with his best year coming in 2004 when he hit .257/.309/.463 with 11 home runs and 31 RBI in 69 games.

Texas Rangers
On June 10, Melhuse was traded by the Athletics to the Texas Rangers for cash.
Adam's career as a Texas Ranger was short-lived, as the club traded for fellow catcher Jarrod Saltalamacchia on July 31, 2007, which lessened Melhuse's playing time. Melhuse was designated for assignment on August 24, 2007, and would later be released.

Oakland Athletics (second stint)
He re-signed with the Athletics for his second stint in 2007 on September 1 when rosters were expanded. Despite being on the Athletics for a second go-around in September, Melhuse sat on the bench the whole time and did not get into a game. He declared free agency on October 8, 2007, though not before being outrighted to the minors on October 5.

Texas Rangers (second stint)
on January 11,  Melhuse signed a minor league contract with an invitation to spring training with the Texas Rangers. He made the team out of spring training as a backup to starting catcher Gerald Laird, but injured his hand in a game against the Detroit Tigers on April 24, resulting in his release.

Colorado Rockies (second stint)
In late June 2008, Melhuse signed a minor league contract with the Colorado Rockies and was called up on August 14, 2008. On August 30, 2008, Melhuse was called up to the Rockies from the Triple-A Sky Sox to replace Yorvit Torrealba who was placed on the DL.

Texas Rangers (third stint)
Melhuse signed a minor league contract with the Texas Rangers in January . However, he was released on April 4.

Pittsburgh Pirates
On May 8, 2009, he signed a minor league contract with the Pittsburgh Pirates.

Retirement
On June 17, 2009 Melhuse announced his retirement.

Post-playing career
Melhuse spent four seasons as an advance scout for the Chicago Cubs and two seasons in the Los Angeles Angels system as manager of the Burlington Bees. In 2018, he joined the Los Angeles Dodgers organization as hitting coach for the Oklahoma City Dodgers. He was transferred to the Tulsa Drillers for 2019.

References

External links

, or Retrosheet, or Pelota Binaria (Venezuelan Winter League)

1972 births
Living people
Albuquerque Dukes players
Baseball coaches from California
Baseball players from California
Brewster Whitecaps players
Cardenales de Lara players
American expatriate baseball players in Venezuela
Chicago Cubs scouts
Colorado Rockies players
Colorado Springs Sky Sox players
Dunedin Blue Jays players
Hagerstown Suns players
Harwich Mariners players
Indianapolis Indians players
Iowa Cubs players
Knoxville Smokies players
Los Angeles Dodgers players
Major League Baseball catchers
Minor league baseball coaches
Minor league baseball managers
Oakland Athletics players
Sacramento River Cats players
San Antonio Missions players
Sportspeople from Santa Clara, California
Syracuse SkyChiefs players
Texas Rangers players
Tri-City Dust Devils players
UCLA Bruins baseball players